The Yamaha MT-10 (called FZ-10 in North America until 2017) is a standard motorcycle made by Japanese motorcycle manufacturer Yamaha in their MT motorcycle series, first sold in 2016. It was introduced at the 2015 EICMA in Milan, Italy. It is the flagship member of the MT range from Yamaha. The crossplane engine is based on the 2015 YZF-R1 but re-tuned to focus on low to mid-range torque. It features a number of significant technical changes including newly designed intake, exhaust and fuelling systems. It produces a claimed  @ 11,500 rpm and  @ 9,000 rpm. The bike with non-functional V-Max-like air scoops replaces the fourteen-year old FZ1 as the flagship bike in Yamaha's sport naked range.

In October 2016, Yamaha released the MT-10 SP (for Europe only), which includes some upgrades such as Öhlins electronic racing suspension derived from the YZF-R1M, full-colour TFT LCD instrument panel, and an exclusive color scheme. For 2018, the bike is now designated MT-10 in all markets.

References

External links 
 
 Building an MT-10 scale model

MT-10
Standard motorcycles
Motorcycles introduced in 2015